Christine Milne led the Australian Greens from 2012 until 2015. During this period, members of parliament served as official spokespersons for the party both inside and outside of Parliament on various issues, each member being assigned portfolios for their speaking duties. This allows the Greens to shadow government policies and actions from the party perspective.

First arrangement

Final arrangement

References

External links
 Portfolios of the Greens caucus

Milne
2012 establishments in Australia
2015 disestablishments in Australia